Jóia Maldita is a 1920 Brazilian silent drama film directed by and starring Luiz de Barros.

The film premiered on 7 June 1920 in Rio de Janeiro.

Cast
Sílvia Bertini   
Iole Burlini   
Antonio Caramuru   
Luiz de Barros   
Haroldo Junqueira   
Pedro Lima   
Atila Moraes   
Alice Ribeiro   
Jácomo Sorrentino   
Antonio Tibiriçá  (as Paulo Sullis)

External links
 

1920 drama films
1920 films
Brazilian black-and-white films
Brazilian silent films
Portuguese words affected by the 1990 spelling reform
Films directed by Luiz de Barros
Brazilian drama films
Silent drama films